Mirage Technologies (Multimedia) Ltd, d/b/a Mirage Media, was a privately owned video game developer and publisher based in Congleton, Cheshire, United Kingdom. It was directed by Peter Jones, which continues to operate as a separate company. Mirage Technologies developed games, such as The Humans, Rise of the Robots, Rise 2: Resurrection and Bedlam. In 1999, it was announced the company was closed.

Games

Ashes of Empire (1992)
The Humans (1992)
King's Table: The Legend of Ragnarok (1993)
World War II: Battles of the South Pacific (1993)
Rise of the Robots (1994)Rise of the Robots: The Director's Cut (1994)Bedlam (1996)Rise 2: Resurrection (1996)Bedlam 2: Absolute Bedlam (1997)Theatre of Pain (1997)Actua Pool'' (1999)

External links

Video game development companies
Video game publishers
Video game companies established in 1992
Video game companies disestablished in 1999
Defunct video game companies of the United Kingdom